Roy Parviz Mottahedeh (born July 3, 1940) is an American historian who is Gurney Professor of History, Emeritus at Harvard University, where he taught courses on the pre-modern social and intellectual history of the Islamic Middle East and is an expert on Iranian culture. Mottahedeh served as the director of Harvard's Center for Middle Eastern Studies from 1987 to 1990, and as the inaugural director of the Prince Alwaleed Bin Talal Islamic Studies Program at Harvard University from 2005 to 2011. He is a follower of the Baha'i faith.

Early life and education
Roy Parviz Mottahedeh was born in New York City on July 3, 1940. His parents were Rafi Y. and Mildred Mottahedeh. He received his primary and secondary education in Quaker schools in New York and Pennsylvania. In 1960 he graduated magna cum laude in history from Harvard College and was awarded a Shaw Traveling Fellowship which he used to explore Europe, the Middle East and Afghanistan. He then undertook a second B.A. in Persian and Arabic at the University of Cambridge in the UK, where he received the E. G. Browne Prize. In 1962 he returned to Harvard for doctoral studies in history, where he studied with Sir Hamilton Gibb and Richard Frye. He was elected a Junior Fellow in the Harvard Society of Fellows and received his PhD in 1970 for a dissertation on Buyid administration.

Career and research
Mottahedeh began his teaching career at Princeton University in 1970. A Guggenheim Fellowship allowed him to write his first book, Loyalty and Leadership in an Early Islamic Society (1980), the manuscript of which gained him tenure. He was one of the first group of MacArthur fellows in 1981. The MacArthur award allowed him to write his second book, The Mantle of the Prophet (1985), which was a study of contemporary Iran as understood through two millennia of history. This book has been widely translated and remains in print.

In 1986 Mottahedeh returned to Harvard University as Professor of Islamic History in the History Department. He served as the Director of the Center for Middle Eastern Studies at Harvard University from 1987 to 1990 and founded the Harvard Middle East and Islamic Review as a medium for Harvard students and teachers to publish their work. He was elected a member of the American Academy of Arts and Sciences and the Council on Foreign Relations and has served as a series editor for several academic publishers. In 1994 he was appointed Gurney Professor of History. Together with Angeliki Laiou he co-edited The Crusades from the Perspective of Byzantium and the Muslim World (2001). His book, Lessons in Islamic Jurisprudence, a translation of Muhammad Baqir al-Sadr's Durus fi 'ilm al 'usul with an introduction, published in 2005, studies the philosophy of Islamic law as taught in Shiʻite seminaries. Mottahedeh received an honorary degree from the University of Lund, Sweden, in 2006. He served as Director of the Prince Alwaleed Bin Talal Islamic Studies Program at Harvard from 2006 to 2011.

Mottahedeh is the author of numerous articles on a wide range of topics from the Abbasid period in the eighth century to Islamic revival movements of the present day. One of his most widely distributed articles, which has been translated into many languages, was his critique of Huntington's theory of the clash of civilizations. His other publications consider topics including the transmission of learning in the Muslim world, the social bonds that connected people in the early Islamic Middle East, the theme of "wonders" in The Thousand and One Nights, the concept of jihad in the early Islamic period, and perceptions of Persepolis among later Muslims.

Awards
 1982 MacArthur Fellowship

Works
   (2nd edition)
 
 
 : a translation of Muhammad Baqir as-Sadr, Durus fi Ilm al-Usul

References

External links
Faculty page at Harvard University 
"Lessons in Islamic Jurisprudence: Review of Roy Mottahedeh's most recent book", Center for Middle Eastern Studies, December 6, 2006
"Review: The Mantle of the Prophet: Religion and Politics in Iran", Foreign Affairs,  John C. Campell, Winter 1985/86
Law, Loyalty and Leadership: Roy P. Mottahedeh's Contribution to Middle Eastern and Islamic Studies at Harvard

1940 births
American Bahá'ís
Harvard College alumni
Harvard University faculty
Living people
MacArthur Fellows
American people of Iranian descent
George School alumni
20th-century American historians
21st-century American historians
20th-century American male writers
21st-century American male writers
American male non-fiction writers
Historians from New York (state)
Writers from New York City
Scholars of Shia Islam